Drive is the second studio album by Anneke van Giersbergen, released in the Benelux Union on 23 September 2013 and internationally on 15 October.

Track listing

Personnel
Anneke van Giersbergen
Anneke van Giersbergen – vocals
Arno Krabman – guitars, keyboards
Ferry Duijsens – guitars, keyboards
Gijs Coolen – guitars
Joost van Haaren – bass
Rob Snijders – drums
Additional personnel
Hayko Cepkin – vocals on "Mental Jungle"
Annelies Kuijsters – backing vocals
Niels Geusebroek – backing vocals
Susanne Clermonts – backing vocals
René Merkelbach – piano on "My Mother Said"
Silvana Jirka – violin on "Mental Jungle"

References

External links
Anneke van Giersbergen's Official site

2013 albums
Anneke van Giersbergen (band) albums